Buanak (also Romanized as Būānak; also known as Bābūnak and Bādūnak) is a village in Kaftarak Rural District, in the Central District of Shiraz County, Fars Province, Iran. At the 2006 census, its population was 674, in 151 families.

References 

Populated places in Shiraz County